El Hadj M'Hamed El Anka, (May 20, 1907 in Algiers –  November 23, 1978 in Algiers) also known as Hadj Muhammed Al Anka, El-Hadj M'Hamed El Anka (and various other combinations), was considered a Grand Master of Andalusian classical music and Algerian chaâbi music.

Early life
He was born on May 20, 1907, under the name Ait Ouarab Mohamed Idir Halo, on 4 Rue Tombouctou in the Casbah of Algiers. His family, Ait Ouarab, were originally from Taguersift near to Freha in Greater Kabylia; his father was Mohamed Ben Hadj Saîd, and his mother was Fatma Bent Boudjemaâ.

His father was taken ill on the day of his birth, and had to be replaced by a maternal uncle for registering the birth, which caused an error recording his name. His uncle presented himself as such to the registry employee, by saying "Ana Khalou" ("I am his uncle" in Arabic), and the employee wrote "Halo". So he became Halo Mohamed Idir from then on.
	
He studied in three schools from 1912 to 1918: Koranic (1912–14), Brahim Fatah (in the Casbah) from 1914–17, and another in Bouzaréah until 1918. He left school to go to work before his 11th birthday.

Musical career
At the age of 13, the orchestra leader sheik Mustapha Nador noticed his passion and innate sense of rhythm at a festival his group was playing at, and took him on as a Tardji (tambourine player) with his orchestra. The sheik and orchestra taught him the mandola, which became El Anka's favorite instrument.

After the death of sheik Nador on May 19, 1926, in Cherchell, El Anka took over the organization of festivals for the group. The orchestra included Si Saîd Larbi (real name Birou), Omar Bébéo (Slimane Allane) and Mustapha Oulid El Meddah among others. In 1927 he began taking part in the courses taught by sheik Sid AH Oulid Lakehal, which he followed assiduously until 1932.

In 1928 he was first exposed to the general public, by recording 27 discs (78 rpm) for Columbia, his first publisher, and taking part in the inauguration of Radio PTT Algiers.

On August 5, 1931, popular sheik Abderrahmane Saîdi died, and El Anka helped to fill the void. His popularity, supported by the new record player and radio, only grew; he was once invited to perform for the King of Morocco. After Columbia, he made another 10 78 rpm disks with Algériaphone in 1932, and another ten 78 rpm records with Polyphone. Upon return from Mecca (in memory of which he composed the song "El Houdja") in 1937, he reformed his orchestra, and toured Algeria and France.

One element of his sound that would have changed in 1932 came from a change of instruments. 1932 was the year he worked with a luthier to craft a bigger mandola. He found that the mandolas used by the orchestra were too high pitched and not loud enough.  He asked a luthier to make one much bigger, and that mandole  was to become his main instrument.

After the Second World War, El HadJ Muhammad El Anka was invited to direct popular music on ENRS Algiers Radio which succeeded Radio PTT. The popular music he promoted from 1946 became "chaâbi". In 1955 he began teaching chaâbi as a professor at the municipal Academy of Algiers. His first pupils all became sheiks in their turn, including Amar Lâachab, Hassen Said, and Rachid Souki.

In total, El Hadj El Anka wrote nearly 360 songs ( qaca' id ) and produced approximately 130 records. Notable works included "Lahmam lirabitou", "ltif Sebhan ellah ya" and "Win saâdi win". He died on November 23, 1978, in Algiers, and was buried in the El Kettar Cemetery.

Songs
Lahmam lirabitou
Sebhan ellah ya ltif
Win saâdi win
Achki fi khnata
El Hamdoulilah li ma b9a isti3mar fi bladna
Sebhan ellah ya ltif
Hadjou Lefkar
:maychali fi youm el harb

Bibliography

References

External links
Bio of El Anka with many photos.
Short bio of El Anka with several good photos.
Page with names of El Anka's students in Chaabi.

  Hadj M'hamed El Anka : La légende du siècle Article by Karim Aïnouche, on "La Kabylie de Matoub LOUNES"

1907 births
1978 deaths
20th-century Algerian  male singers
Algerian mondol players
Berber musicians
Kabyle people
People from Casbah